The Minister of Public Security was a member of the Executive Committee of the Privy Council of Northern Ireland (Cabinet) in the Parliament of Northern Ireland from 1940 to 1944.

Parliamentary Secretary to the Ministry of Public Security
1941 – 1943 Brian Maginess
Office abolished 1943

References
The Government of Northern Ireland

1940 establishments in Northern Ireland
1944 disestablishments in Northern Ireland
Executive Committee of the Privy Council of Northern Ireland